Easter Ross is a loosely defined area in the east of Ross, Highland, Scotland.

The name is used in the constituency name Caithness, Sutherland and Easter Ross, which is the name of both a British House of Commons constituency and a Scottish Parliament constituency. The two constituencies have however different boundaries.

Settlements

Places in Easter Ross include:

 Alness
 Dingwall (included in some contexts in the term Easter Ross, though in some contexts it refers to the area to the north-east of Dingwall)
 Evanton
 Invergordon
 Kildary
 Milntown of Tarbat (Milton)
 Portmahomack
 The Seaboard villages:
 Balintore
 Hilton of Cadboll
 Shandwick
 Tain

Easter Ross is well known for Black Isle and its towns: Avoch, Rosemarkie, Fortrose, and Cromarty.

See also
 Black Isle
 Ross and Cromarty
 Ross-shire
 Wester Ross

References

Ross and Cromarty